Albert "Bert" Cambridge was an English professional rugby league footballer who played in the 1930s.

International honours
Bert Cambridge won a cap for England while at Broughton Rangers in 1935 against France.

References

Broughton Rangers players
England national rugby league team players
English rugby league players
Place of birth missing
Place of death missing
Rugby league second-rows
Year of birth missing
Year of death missing